Sierra Forest is a codename for Intel's first generation E-core based Xeon server processors. It is fabricated using Intel's Intel 3 process and compatible with the LGA-7529 socket.

Sierra Forest will be used as part of the Birch Stream server platform in 2024.

History 
Sierra Forest was first announced during Intel's Investor Meeting on February 17, 2022. The roadmap presented showed upcoming Xeon processors being split into separate tracks for those with only P-cores and those with only E-cores.

Architecture 
Sierra Forest will use only E-cores to achieve higher core counts in order to compete with AMD's Epyc server processors codenamed Bergamo which features up to 128 smaller Zen 4c cores. AMD's Zen 4c cores feature simultaneous multithreading (SMT) while the Gracemont E-cores featured in Sierra Forest processors only contain one thread for each core. The purpose of the Sierra Forest architecture design is to achieve ultra-high core counts for greater compute density that would benefit cloud and HPC server applications. Cloud service providers may not be as interested in HPC accelerators and instead prioritize greater ECU/vCPU integer and floating-point performance.

See also 
 Process–architecture–optimization model, by Intel
 Tick–tock model, by Intel
 List of Intel CPU microarchitectures

References 

Intel products
Intel microprocessors